Garden Plain Township is located in Whiteside County, Illinois. As of the 2021 census, its population was 983 and it contained 492 housing units.

Geography

Demographics

References

External links
City-data.com
Whiteside County Official Site
https://www.citypopulation.de/en/usa/illinois/admin/whiteside/1719528586__garden_plain/

Townships in Whiteside County, Illinois
Townships in Illinois